Dehkadeh-ye Taleqani (also Romanized as Dehkadeh-ye Ţāleqānī) is a village in Ramjin Rural District, Chaharbagh District, Savojbolagh County, Alborz Province, Iran. At the 2006 census, its population was 319, in 82 families.

References 

Populated places in Savojbolagh County